WILK (980 kHz) is a commercial AM radio station in Wilkes-Barre, Pennsylvania.  It is owned by Audacy, Inc. and airs a talk radio format.  WILK is powered at 5,000 watts by day using a non-directional antenna.  But to avoid interfering with other stations on AM 980 at night, it reduces power to 1,000 watts and uses a directional antenna with a three-tower array.  The transmitter is off WVSA Drive in Wilkes-Barre.

WILK is one of four simulcast radio stations in Northeastern Pennsylvania that call themselves WILK Newsradio, along with 103.1 WILK-FM in Avoca, 1300 WODS in West Hazleton and 910 WAAF in Scranton.  Studios and offices are on Route 315 in Pittston.  

"WILK Newsradio" has a weekday schedule with mostly local hosts, except for the early afternoon when the station carries Rush Limbaugh.  At night, the stations air nationally syndicated shows including Dave Ramsey, Coast to Coast AM with George Noory and America in The Morning.  Weekends feature shows on money, health, technology and science.  Weekend syndicated hosts include Kim Komando, Clark Howard, Dr. Michio Kaku and "Somewhere in Time" with Art Bell.  Some hours on weekends are paid brokered programming.  Most hours begin with world and national news from ABC News Radio.

The stations also carries play-by-play sports including Penn State Nittany Lions football and basketball, as well as Wilkes-Barre/Scranton Penguins minor league hockey.

History
On February 13, 1947, WILK first signed on the air. The first studios were located at 88 North Franklin Street in Wilkes-Barre.  The station's original broadcast frequency was 1450 kHz, operating at 250 watts during its early years.  In 1951 WSCR in Scranton moved from 1000 kHz to 1320, making it possible for WILK to move to AM 980 with a three tower array, increasing its power to 5000 watts non-directional by day and 1000 watts directional at night.  It was an ABC radio network affiliate.

On February 6, 1954, the station signed on a television station, WILK-TV Channel 34.  Because WILK had been a long-time ABC Radio affiliate, WILK-TV took ABC Television affiliation.  That station merged with Scranton's WARM-TV to form WNEP-TV on Channel 16.

From the 1990s until 2005, WILK was the originating station for the WILK Radio Network.  However, that distinction now belongs to FM sister station WILK-FM.

References

External links

ILK
Audacy, Inc. radio stations
Radio stations established in 1947
1947 establishments in Pennsylvania
News and talk radio stations in the United States